Generative audio refers to the creation of audio files from databases of audio clips. This technology differs from AI voices such as Apple's Siri or Amazon's Alexa, which use a collection of fragments that are stitched together on demand. 
 Generative audio works by using neural networks to learn the statistical properties of an audio source, then reproduces those properties.

Implications 
With this technology, a person's voice can be replicated to speak phrases that they may have never spoken. This could lead to a synthetic version of a public figure's voice being used against them.

Technology 
This method uses generative adversarial network (GAN), a deep machine learning technique where two machine learning models work against each other to create realistic audio.

See also 
 Generative Art
 Generative Music

References

Sound production